Wallenhorst is a municipality in the district of Osnabrück, in Lower Saxony, Germany. It is situated in the Wiehengebirge, approx. 10 km north of Osnabrück.

The New St. Alexander Church serves as a reference height for all other heights in the German Mean Height Reference System (Normalhöhennull).

Notable people 
 Georg Budke (1900–1994), politician CDU
 Hubert Müller (1936–1995), Catholic priest, theologian and church lawyer
 Johanna Voß (born 1957), politician (The Left)

Other personalities 
 Clemens Lammerskitten (born 1957), politician CDU
 Stefan Niggemeier (born 1969), media journalist, grew up in the Wallenhorster districts of Rulle and Lechtingen
 Horst Georg Pöhlmann (born 1933), German evangelical theologian, lives in Wallenhorst
 Irmgard Vogelsang (born 1946), politician CDU

References

External links
 

Osnabrück (district)